Broughty Ferry railway station is a railway station serving the suburb of Broughty Ferry in Dundee, Scotland. It is sited  from the former Dundee East station, on the Dundee to Aberdeen line, between Dundee and Balmossie. 

It is the oldest railway station in Scotland which is still in operation.

History 
The station was opened on 6 October 1838 on the Dundee and Arbroath Railway. When North British Railway were granted joint ownership of the line on 21 July 1879, the station buildings were gradually rebuilt until around 1900.

Accidents and incidents 
At 7:20 pm on 21 October 1991, a Dundee bound Aberdeen–London Intercity express destroyed two out of the four gates of the level crossing. The fifty passengers on board and five people in a passing car were fortunate to avoid collision when the train passed through the crossing at around 80 miles per hour. The gates had not been closed before the train passed the level crossing. Dundee District Council (now defunct) had previously postponed planning permission to modernise the gates. They were replaced by the current arrangement of four barriers in 1995, with control transferred to Dundee Signalling Centre.

Subsequent restoration of the station saw the removal of the historic footbridge, which now languishes behind the westbound platform, leaving only an underpass for those wishing to cross the line at Gray Street, or walk the short distance to another overbridge, when the barriers are lowered. The footbridge was closed to the public before the crossing was modernised.

Facilities 
The station is unstaffed, with benches and help points available on both platforms, plus a payphone and cycle racks on platform 1, although a shelter is available on platform 2. Step-free access is available to both platforms from the main road, but both platforms are also joined via the subway. As there are no facilities to purchase tickets, passengers must buy one in advance, or from the guard on the train.

Passenger volume 
In recent years, passenger usage has grown phenomenally, from under 10,000 in 2012-12 to over 90,000 in 2019-20, including a 24,000 rise between 2018-19 and 2019-20. 15 years earlier, usage hovered around 5,000 passengers per year.

The statistics cover twelve month periods that start in April.

Services 
Service frequencies at the station have varied significantly over the years - prior to 1990, there were regular local trains to Arbroath and Dundee or Perth throughout the day along with a small number of longer-distance workings, but a shortage of rolling stock led to the service being significantly cut at the May timetable change that year. For the next twenty years, only a handful of trains (4 per day each way on average) stopped here, but since then there has a gradual increase in provision following a campaign by the local authority & rail user groups (eight additional stops were added in December 2011).

As of May 2022, on weekdays and Saturdays there is an hourly service in each direction, to Dundee westbound (with one extended to Glasgow and one to Perth), and eastbound to Arbroath (with one extended to Aberdeen, one to Inverurie and one to Inverness). On Sundays, there are only 3 northbound services to Aberdeen and 4 southbound services: two to Edinburgh, one to Glasgow Queen Street and one to Perth.

References

External links 

RailScot History of Broughty Ferry station

Railway stations in Dundee
Former Dundee and Arbroath Railway stations
Railway stations in Great Britain opened in 1838
Railway stations served by ScotRail
Category A listed buildings in Dundee
Listed railway stations in Scotland
1838 establishments in Scotland
Broughty Ferry